Hyainailourini ("hyena-cats") is an extinct polyphyletic tribe of hyainailourid hyaenodonts from paraphyletic subfamily Hyainailourinae that lived in Africa, Asia and Europe during the middle Eocene to middle Miocene.

Classification and phylogeny

Taxonomy
 Tribe: †Hyainailourini (polyphyletic tribe) 
 Genus: †Exiguodon 
 †Exiguodon pilgrimi 
 Genus: †Falcatodon 
 †Falcatodon schlosseri 
 Genus: †Hyainailouros (polyphyletic genus) 
 †Hyainailouros bugtiensis 
 †Hyainailouros napakensis 
 †Hyainailouros sulzeri 
 Genus: †Parapterodon 
 †Parapterodon lostangensis 
 Genus: †Sectisodon 
 †Sectisodon markgrafi 
 †Sectisodon occultus 
 Genus: †Sivapterodon 
 †Sivapterodon lahirii 
 Subtribe: †Isohyaenodontina (polyphyletic subtribe) 
 Genus: †Isohyaenodon (polyphyletic genus) 
 †Isohyaenodon andrewsi 
 †Isohyaenodon zadoki 
 (unranked): †Pterodon clade
 Genus: †Kerberos 
 †Kerberos langebadreae 
 Subtribe: †Pterodontina 
 Genus: †Pterodon 
 †Pterodon dasyuroides 
 Incertae sedis:
 †"Pterodon" syrtos 
 Incertae sedis:
 †"Pterodon" africanus 
 †"Pterodon" phiomensis 
 †"Pterodon" sp. [DPC 5036]

Phylogeny
The phylogenetic relationships of tribe Hyainailourini are shown in the following cladogram:

See also
 Mammal classification
 Hyainailourinae

References

Hyaenodonts
Cenozoic mammals of Africa
Cenozoic mammals of Asia
Cenozoic mammals of Europe
Mammal tribes